The Gorya class, Soviet designation Project 12660, are a group of minesweepers built for the Soviet Navy in the late 1980s. Three ships were started of which two were completed and are in service with the Russian Navy.

Design

The ships are designed for deep ocean sweeping of captor mines with sophisticated mine detection equipment. Sweeping gear includes two submersibles as well as conventional sweeps.  Russian press boasted that the Project 12660 minesweepers were the first sweepers in the history of Soviet military shipbuilding capable of not only destroying the "Captor" mines, "Colas" ASW coverage buoys, and other enemy underwater objects at depths of up to 1000 meters.

Ships
A total of twenty ships were planned, but the programme was stopped by the collapse of the Soviet Union. Two ships were completed.

See also
List of ships of the Soviet Navy
List of ships of Russia by project number

References
 Also published as 

Mine warfare vessel classes
Minesweepers of the Soviet Navy
Minesweepers of the Russian Navy